Sir Arthur Harold Marshall, KBE (2 August 1870 – 18 January 1956) was an English Liberal Party politician.  He was Member of Parliament (MP) for Wakefield 1910–1918 and for Huddersfield 1922–1923.

Background
Arthur Harold Marshall was born in Ashton-under-Lyne, Lancashire, a son of Methodist Minister Rev. H.T. Marshall DD and Mary Keats of Hanley. He was educated privately and at Yorkshire College (University of Leeds). He travelled extensively in South Africa, Canada, U.S.A. and Europe. In 1896 he married Louie Hepworth, the third daughter of Joseph Hepworth JP of Leeds, Torquay and Harrogate. In 1918 he became a Knight of the British Empire. In 1948 his wife died.

Profession
In 1904 Marshall qualified as a barrister, being called to the Bar by Gray's Inn. He practiced on the North-Eastern Circuit. He was a director of the Legal Insurance Company and of J Hepworth & Son (Limited). He was director of Bradford & District Newspaper Company Limited.

Political
Marshall was elected to Harrogate Town Council, serving for six years.
In December 1910 he was elected to parliament as Liberal MP for Wakefield. He gained his seat from the Conservatives. He was the first Liberal to win the division since 1880. From 1910-1918 he served as a Liberal Whip. He was Chairman and Honorary Secretary of the Yorkshire Liberal Federation. He was Chairman of the Central Billeting Board. He was a member of the National War Savings Committee and of the National War Aims Committee.

In December 1918 he lost his seat to the Unionist he had defeated eight years earlier. There were two significant differences from 1910, firstly a Labour candidate intervened and secondly the endorsement from the wartime Coalition Government went to his Unionist opponent. In 1920 when a Conservative vacancy occurred in Ashton-under-Lyne, the town of his birth, he became the Liberal candidate for the by-election. Although no Liberal had stood in 1918 the party held the seat after the January 1910 elections. However, in a close contest between Unionist and Labour, he trailed in third place. At the next general election in 1922 he sought a return to parliament at Huddersfield. The division had returned a Coalition Government backed Liberal in 1918 against an official Liberal. Marshall had the support of Huddersfield Liberal Association and the defending member sought re-election as a National Liberal with the support of David Lloyd George and the local Conservatives. A Labour candidate made it a three-way contest. Marshall narrowly gained the seat for the Liberal Party. In parliament he again served as a Liberal Whip. A year later there was another general election. This time the Liberals were united and Marshall sought re-election against Labour and Unionist challengers. Marshall managed to increase his vote but his Labour opponent managed to do the same and beat Marshall by just 26 votes. In 1924 another general election was called and Marshall was again Liberal candidate for Huddersfield. In another close three-party contest, he was edged into third place by the Unionist. He did not stand for parliament again.

Electoral record

References

External links 
 

1870 births
1956 deaths
Liberal Party (UK) MPs for English constituencies
Knights Commander of the Order of the British Empire
UK MPs 1910–1918
UK MPs 1922–1923
Politics of Wakefield
Politics of Huddersfield